Peshi Puza is a village in Afghanistan, midway between Herat and Kabul.

Its mountainous location results in temperature variation from -20 °C to 11 °C, with most precipitation in winter.  The population is predominantly Hazara.

References

Villages in Afghanistan